The Patrick and Margaret Kinney House was designed by architect Frank Lloyd Wright and it was built in 1951. The home is located in Lancaster, Wisconsin. The house was added to the State Register of Historic Places in 2007 and to the National Register of Historic Places the following year.

History
Patrick Kinney and his wife, Margaret, built the house to raise their three children in. They hired Wright as the architect because Margaret had worked for Wright's sister, Jane Porter, while a college student. Patrick Kinney, a prominent lawyer, worked as the general contractor on the building in order to cut down on costs. Additionally, while Wright suggested the building should be made out of concrete blocks, the Kinneys decided on using stone. Every day Patrick Kinney "would be up at the crack of dawn and quarry two loads of stone and deliver them to the site... before heading off to court or the office."

The building is set on a grid of 30-and 60-degree equilateral parallelograms with the master bedroom as a hexagon at the head, with the children's bedrooms coming off of it. It was originally designed with two, instead of three, children's bedrooms because Wright misunderstood how many children the Kinneys had. Therefore, his apprentice, John H. "Jack" Howe, later enlarged the building.

References

 Storrer, William Allin. The Frank Lloyd Wright Companion. University of Chicago Press, 2006,  (S.342)

External links
 Exterior photographs of the house

Houses on the National Register of Historic Places in Wisconsin
National Register of Historic Places in Grant County, Wisconsin
Houses in Grant County, Wisconsin
Frank Lloyd Wright buildings
Modern Movement architecture in the United States
Limestone buildings in the United States
Houses completed in 1953